The Killings of Copenhagen is the 100th episode of the world-famous British TV series Midsomer Murders. The episode is also the first where a murder takes place outside the United Kingdom, and only the second outside the fictitious county of Midsomer (the first being in Brighton, East Sussex in the 75th episode). It was filmed and produced in late autumn 2013. In Britain this episode first aired on 12 February 2014.

Plot
Midsomer biscuit tycoon Eric Calder stays at a hotel located at the large City Hall Square (Rådhuspladsen) during a visit to Copenhagen. He receives and opens what appears to be an empty biscuit tin. However, he becomes dizzy, and after an attempt to wash his hands, he falls down dead.
 
As the goods were sent from Midsomer, Danish detective Birgitte Poulsen asks Barnaby to investigate. DCI Barnaby and DS Nelson start their investigation at home, but when a second body ends up at a Danish biscuit factory in a shipment from Midsomer, they have to take a flight across the North Sea. Barnaby is in a hurry to finish because his wife Sarah is nearing her due date.

Barnaby, Nelson, and their Danish counterparts uncover a second life for the first victim in Copenhagen, one that circles back to Midsomer. They arrive too late to stop two more murders, but triumph in the end.

Production

As the show's special 100th episode, the episode was set in part in Denmark in recognition of the popularity of Danish crime dramas such as The Killing in the UK, and of Midsomer Murders in Denmark. The plot revolves around a recipe for Danish-style butter cookies, and includes elements borrowed from Hamlet, a classic British drama set in Denmark.

Cast and other credits
 DCI John Barnaby - Neil Dudgeon
 DS Charlie Nelson - Gwilym Lee
 VKK Birgitte Poulsen - Ann Eleonora Jørgensen 
 KA Anna Degn - Birgitte Hjort Sorensen 
 Eric Calder - Marcus Hutton
 Penelope Calder - Caroline Goodall
 Ingrid Madsen - Marie Askehave 
 Harry Calder - Jonathan Barnwell
 Julian Calder - Adrian Lukis
 Armand Stone - Sanjeev Bhaskar
 Summer Haleston - Poppy Drayton
 Clara Trout - Joanna Scanlan
 Atticus Bradley - Richard Cordery
 Ernest Bradley - Nicholas Jones
 Albert Toft - Thomas Thorøe 
 Sofie Bruun - Julie Agnete Vang 
 Thomas Madsen - Nicolaj Kopernikus 
 Sarah Barnaby - Fiona Dolman
 Dr. Kate Wilding - Tamzin Malleson
 Screenplay - Paul Logue
 Produced by - Louise Sutton
 Directed by - Alex Pillai

References

Midsomer Murders episodes
2014 British television episodes